Tilali Rose Leslie Scanlan (born 3 November 1999) is an American Samoan swimmer. She competed in the women's 100 metre breaststroke at the 2020 Summer Olympics.

References

External links
 

1999 births
Living people
American Samoan female swimmers
Olympic swimmers of American Samoa
Swimmers at the 2020 Summer Olympics
Place of birth missing (living people)
21st-century American women